The slaty robin (Peneothello cyanus), also known as the blue-grey robin, is a species of bird in the family Petroicidae, present in the New Guinea Highlands and sparsely in the island's northern areas.
Its natural habitat is subtropical or tropical moist montane forests.

Described by Italian naturalist, Tommaso Salvadori, in 1874, the slaty robin is a member of the Australasian robin family Petroicidae. Sibley and Ahlquist's DNA-DNA hybridisation studies placed this group in a Corvida parvorder comprising many tropical and Australian passerines including pardalotes, fairy-wrens, honeyeaters, and crows. However, subsequent molecular research (and current consensus) places the robins as a very early offshoot of the Passerida (or "advanced" songbirds), within the songbird lineage.

Measuring , the slaty robin has fairly uniform blue-grey plumage, which is slightly lighter underneath and slightly darker on the cheeks and face. The tail and flight feathers are grey-black. The bill and feet are black, and the eyes are dark brown.

Within the rainforest it is found in pairs in the understory or on the ground. It is insectivorous, and hunts by gleaning. It eats ants, beetles, and thyonnid wasps.

One or two pale-greenish or olive eggs, splotched with olive or brown, are laid, and measure 23.5 mm x 17–19 mm.

References

slaty robin
slaty robin
Taxonomy articles created by Polbot